Macrodontia may refer to:
 Macrodontia (tooth), a tooth disorder where the teeth are larger than normal
 Macrodontia (beetle), a genus of beetles

See also 
 Macrodonta (disambiguation)